La Bien-aimée is a 1967 French television drama directed by Jacques Doniol-Valcroze. It was based on short story "Fanny" by Lucie Faure who wrote screenplay. The music score is by Maurice Leroux. The production designer was Jean d'Eaubonne and the cinematographer was Sacha Vierny.

Principal cast
 Michèle Morgan as Fanny Dréal 
Paul Guers as Albert de Frézac 
Jean-Marc Bory as Jacques Forestier 
Eleonore Hirt as La comtesse de Frézac  
Marc Eyraud as Le père de Mérode  
Nelly Borgeaud as Mme Claude 
Margo Lion as Mme Floirat  
Marianne Comtell as Antoinette
 Florence Giorgetti as Alice

External links
La Bien-aimée at AlloCiné

French television films
1967 television films
1967 films
1960s French films